Whiting High School is a public high school located in Whiting, Indiana. It was founded in 1898.

Notable alumni

See also
 List of high schools in Indiana

References

External links
 Official Website

Buildings and structures in Lake County, Indiana
Educational institutions established in 1898
1898 establishments in Indiana
Public high schools in Indiana
Whiting, Indiana